El Toro High School is a public high school in Lake Forest, California, United States. It is one of five high schools in the Saddleback Valley Unified School District (SVUSD) and serves Lake Forest and its district of Portola Hills and a small portion of east Irvine. "El Toro" was the name of the community from the 1870s until a referendum in 1991. The school has served the area since 1973. The current principal of the school is Terri Gusiff.

History
El Toro began participating in the International Baccalaureate Program in 2004, the program was scheduled to end in 2011 due to district and state budget cuts, however it was slated to continue into 2012 school year.

During the 2007 California wildfires, more specifically the Santiago Fire, Governor Arnold Schwarzenegger made a speech at El Toro High School It was also used as an evacuation center.

During the recent 2020 California Wildfires, more specifically during the Silverado Fire, El Toro High School was again used as an evacuation center for those that were impacted in Foothill Ranch, Lake Forest, and Portola Hills.

The high school was also the former home of the "El Toro 20 Stair", which became a notable spot for skateboarding as many high-profile tricks had been filmed at the stairs.

Notable alumni 

 Nolan Arenado - Professional baseball third baseman for the St. Louis Cardinals and Colorado Rockies; 6-time All-Star, 5-time Platinum Glove Award winner
 Adrien Beard - Storyboard Artist and Voice, known for voicing Token Black on South Park
 Lauren Chamberlain - softball infielder, played first base for the University of Oklahoma, where she is the Division I career home runs leader, also played professionally
 Matt Chapman - Professional baseball third baseman for the Toronto Blue Jays and Oakland Athletics; 3-time Gold Glove Award winner
 Diane Murphy - Actress, twin sister of Erin murphy, who also played the role of "Tabitha Stephens" in the ABC television sitcom Bewitched.
 Erin Murphy - Actress, best known for her role as young Tabitha Stephens in the ABC television sitcom Bewitched.
 Marc Stein - American sports reporter best known for his coverage of the  National Basketball Association.
 Christina Smith - Playmate Playboy Centerfold March 1998
 Brian Krause - Actor, Charmed, Steven Kings Sleepwalkers
 Kristy Swanson - Actress, Buffy the Vampire Slayer
 Rob Johnson - NFL player, Buffalo Bills quarterback
 Steve Stenstrom - NFL player, quarterback: Kansas City Chiefs, Chicago Bears, San Francisco 49ers, Detroit Lions and the Denver Broncos

References

External links
 

Educational institutions established in 1973
Lake Forest, California
High schools in Orange County, California
International Baccalaureate schools in California
Public high schools in California
1973 establishments in California